Rock On!! is a 2008 Indian Hindi-language musical drama film written and directed by Abhishek Kapoor, produced by Farhan Akhtar, and with music by Shankar–Ehsaan–Loy. The film marks the successful Bollywood debut of Akhtar and Prachi Desai. Akhtar, Arjun Rampal, Luke Kenny, and Purab Kohli star as members of the Mumbai-based grunge rock band, "Magik" (formed in 1998) who reunite in 2008. The winner of seven Filmfare Awards, Rock On!! was critically acclaimed but had an average performance at the box office. Inspired by the critically acclaimed  South Korean movie 'A Happy Life'. The film was archived at the Academy Film Archive library.

The direct sequel, Rock On!! 2, was released eight years later in 2016, but to negative reviews.

Plot
Rock On!! begins in Mumbai, with the rock band Magik, in 1998. The band are best friends and enjoy a carefree, freewheeling life together. Aditya Shroff (Farhan Akhtar) is the lead singer who rebelled against his well-to-do family to play music. Joseph (Joe) Mascarenhas (Arjun Rampal) is the lead guitarist who feels the necessity to prove his worth as a musician. Keyboardist Rob Nancy (Luke Kenny) and drummer Kedar Zaveri (a.k.a. KD/"Killer Drama" (Purab Kohli) comprise the remainder of the band. After a competition is announced by Channel V, they decide to enter, as the winner will be offered an album contract and at least one music video.

Magik win the competition, but soon realise they will have to go through some sacrifices while signing the contract. Joe feels the most slighted when a song he wrote for his girlfriend, Debbie (Shahana Goswami), which was the only slow track on the entire album, is excluded from the track list to make space for a remix song. Debbie is also rejected as the band's stylist without even being called for any demonstration. Later, when filming the music video, the band are forced to wear clothes they do not like, and the cameramen focus only on Aditya. Joe becomes furious at Aditya and the director, hitting them both before leaving with Debbie. Aditya, who failed to notice that anything was amiss, is shocked and as the band loses their contract, he reacts by abandoning music as well his girlfriend Tania (Nicolette Bird). "Magik" thus disbands and its members become estranged.

Ten years later, Aditya is a wealthy, high-powered investment banker with a beautiful wife, Sakshi (Prachi Desai), and a luxury home, yet he is constantly unhappy. Hoping to relieve his habitual sullen mood, Sakshi decides to gift him a gold-chain wrist watch for his birthday. She meets her friend Devika (Koel Purie) at a jewellery shop, which by chance is owned by KD's father and where KD himself is working, albeit unenthusiastically. He overhears Sakshi talking about Aditya and introduces himself. Sakshi later conveys the meeting to Aditya who denies having ever known anyone called KD. Soon afterwards, while Aditya is away on a business trip, Sakshi finds a box containing old photos and videos of Magik. She takes them to show KD and asks him come to a birthday party she is planning for Aditya, and to invite the rest of the band.

KD meets with Rob, who now makes a living composing jingles for advertisements. Together, they invite Joe, who is now married to Debbie but lives largely unemployed, with an eight-year-old son. The family is supported by Debbie, who has a small fishing business but who also holds a grudge against the band for the way it affected Joe. Joe feels he should reconcile with his old friends, but Debbie sees this as his weakness. KD and Rob thus attend the party without Joe, and Aditya is shocked to see them. He later scolds Sakshi for trying to dig up his past, which he claims to have left behind. Sakshi is hurt, and she leaves him after informing him that she is pregnant. Devika persuades Aditya to face his past and meet with his ex-bandmates. KD, Joe, and Rob meet up and visit the place where they used to practice as a band. Aditya also arrives and reconciles with Joe and the rest. They start practicing regularly at Aditya's house. Learning about this, Sakshi, too, returns to Aditya.

Channel V announces another contest, and at Rob's insistence, the band enters. Meanwhile, Debbie arranges a guitar-playing job for Joe on a cruise ship, which is due to set sail on the same day as the contest. It is later discovered that Rob is dying of a brain tumour and his last wish is to perform with Magik. The contest is aired on the radio, and while Joe is on his way to the airport, he hears Magik perform the song he wrote for Debbie ten years earlier, which they dedicate to him. This prompts him to join the band at the competition, where he and Aditya sing a duet in a triumphant performance.

The epilogue reveals that Rob died two months after that performance. Sakshi gives birth to a baby boy, whom they name "Rob" in memory of their friend. Devika is dating KD, who starts a record company with Joe. Debbie quits her job in the fishing business and becomes a successful stylist. The band members and their families meet every weekend to keep the band's "Magik" alive forever.

Cast
 Arjun Rampal as Joseph Mascarenhas (Joe)
 Farhan Akhtar as Aditya Shroff (Adi)
 Purab Kohli as Kedar Zaveri / Killer Drummer "KD"
 Luke Kenny as Rob Nancy
 Prachi Desai as Sakshi Shroff, wife of Aditya Shroff
 Shahana Goswami as Debbie Mascarenhas
 Koel Purie as Devika
 Dalip Tahil as Bajaj
 Suraj Jagan as Ajay
 Monica Dogra as herself (Shaair)
 Nicolette Bird as Tanya
 Anu Malik as himself
 Jameel Khan as Tolani
 Jonathan Horovitz as Travel Writer

Response

Box office
Despite critical acclaim, the film grossed only 27.46 crore ($4.1 million) in India; Box Office India labeled it as an "average grosser". It earned  on its opening day in India.

Critical reception
Rock On was well received by a number of critics. Subhash K. Jha gave Rock On a rave review. He states: "Seldom has a film blended the music of life into the fabric of a film with such seamless expertise. Rock On!! is that rarity where every component character and episode falls into place with fluent virility." Nikhat Kazmi of the Times of India gave it four stars and argued, "if you really want to see how Bollywood has matured and come of age, then here's the perfect litmus test. For Rock On is a film that not only breaks new ground in terms of its subject matter – now when has desi movielore ever tackled something akin to Hollywood's That Thing You Do — it creates a whole new EQ (emotional quotient) for mainstream cinema." Khalid Mohamed, of the Hindustan Times gave the film three and a half out of four stars and describes it as "hard candy." He also states that "the performances are of the highest order". Manish Gajjar of the BBC gave Rock On!! four out of five stars and describes it as "an enthralling watch, with entertaining moments to make you smile. Predicted to be a cult movie for many years to come, it truly deserves the Bollywood awards this year! A must-see whether you are a rock fan or not!" Taran Adarsh of Bollywood Hungama gave Rock On!! four out of five stars and states: "Put your hands together for one of the finest films of our times. Put your hands together for a director who pulls off a challenging subject with élan. Put your hands together for the actors who pitch in superlative performances." Kaveree Bamzai of India Today called Rock On "refreshing" and "surprisingly quiet and thoughtful."

Other critics gave the film mixed reviews. Rajeev Masand of CNN-IBN gave the film three out of five stars and states: "With Rock On, director Abhishek Kapoor promises a true-blue band film, but ultimately delivers a masala Hindi film that just happens to be about a band [...] Yet, Rock On is rescued by some marvelous moments that stay with you until the end."

Soundtrack

The original score and songs were composed by Shankar–Ehsaan–Loy. The songs' lyrics were written by Javed Akhtar. According to the Indian trade website Box Office India, with around 12,00,000 units sold, this film's soundtrack album was the year's thirteenth highest-selling.

Accolades

Sequel

A sequel to the film, Rock On 2, was released on 11 November 2016. Akhtar, Rampal, Kohli, Desai and Goswami reprise their roles from the first film.

Notes

References

External links
 

2008 films
2000s Hindi-language films
2000s buddy films
2000s musical drama films
Films featuring a Best Supporting Actor National Film Award-winning performance
Films set in Mumbai
Indian buddy films
Indian musical drama films
Indian rock music films
Best Hindi Feature Film National Film Award winners
Films directed by Abhishek Kapoor
2008 drama films